Never Kissed Goodnight: A Leigh Koslow Mystery is a crime novel by the American writer Edie Claire set in contemporary Pittsburgh, Pennsylvania.

It tells the story of advertising copywriter Leigh Koslow, whose cousin Cara's father abandoned her when she was a baby. Koslow seeks to find out why.

The novel is the fourth in a series of five Leigh Koslow mysteries.

"Edie Claire is a bright new mystery writer of outstanding gayness. The fast-paced story line retains a serious tone with humorous interludes to ease the tension and turn the sleuthing relatives into real people. A winning amateur sleuth tale that showcases a new talent."— Midwest Book Review

Sources
Contemporary Authors Online. The Gale Group, 2006.

External links
  Author's homepage

2001 American novels
American crime novels
Novels set in Pittsburgh
Signet Books books